The first series of Warsaw Shore, a Polish television programme based in Warsaw, began airing on 10 November 2013 on MTV , after transmission from 2013 MTV Europe Music Awards in Amsterdam, Nederlands. The series concluded on 2 February 2014 after 11 episodes and 2 specials including an episode counting down the best bits of the series and reunion show hosted by Katarzyna Kępka. This was the only series to feature Mariusz Śmietanowski. Holly Hagan and Scott Timlin from Geordie Shore  made a guest appearance during the last episode of the season.

Cast
Anna Ryśnik
Eliza Wesołowska
Ewelina Kubiak
Anna "Mała" Aleksandrzak
Mariusz Śmietanowski
Paweł Cattaneo
Paweł "Trybson" Trybała
Wojciech Gola

Duration of cast

Notes 

 Key:  = "Cast member" is featured in this episode.
 Key:  = "Cast member" arrives in the house.
 Key:  = "Cast member" voluntarily leaves the house.
 Key:  = "Cast member" returns to the house.
 Key:  = "Cast member" leaves the series.

Episodes

References 

2010s Polish television series
Series 1
2013 Polish television seasons
2014 Polish television seasons